Cheng Yi (Wade–Giles: Ch'eng I) may refer to:

 Cheng Yi (Tang dynasty) (died 819), Tang dynasty chief councilor
 Cheng Yi (philosopher) (1033–1107), Song dynasty philosopher
 Cheng Yi (actor) (born 1990), Chinese actor
 Cheng Yi (成宜), Han dynasty warlord involved in the Battle of Tong Pass (211)

See also
 Chen Yi (disambiguation)
 Zhengyi (disambiguation)